My Dog Vincent is a 1998 comedy film written and directed by award-winning writer and filmmaker Michael McGowan.

Plot
The film is centered on O'Brien (played by Chuck Campbell) and his friends, Wiley and Harper. These three twenty-something young men still live at home, and are looking to expand their horizons in life and love. This coming-of-age story is weaved with their hobbies and interests, both existing and new, one of which is an obsession with Vincent Price. O’Brien is aided in expanding his horizons by his girlfriend Sue.

Cast
 Chuck Campbell as O'Brien Higgins
 Gavin Crawford as Harper
 Ben Carlson as Wiley
 Kyle Downes as Nathan
 Dinah Watts as Mrs Higgins
 Zehra Leverman as Sue

Location and release dates

External links

 
The New York Times Movies Review

1998 films
Canadian comedy films
1998 comedy films
Canadian independent films
English-language Canadian films
Films directed by Michael McGowan
1990s English-language films
1990s Canadian films